, also known as The Greenwich Japanese School (GJS), is a Japanese elementary and junior high school, located in Greenwich, Connecticut, near New York City. As of 1992 the Ministry of Education of Japan funds the school, which is one of the two Japanese day schools of the Japanese Educational Institute of New York (JEI; ニューヨーク日本人教育審議会 Nyūyōku Nihonjin Kyōiku Shingi Kai), a nonprofit organization which also operates two Japanese weekend schools in the New York City area. Before 1991 the Japanese School of New York was located in Queens, New York City, and for one year it was located in Yonkers, New York.

History
On April 25, 1975, a group of Japanese parents, under the Japanese Educational Institute of New York, founded the school. The school, which opened on September 2, 1975 in Queens, New York City, was New York City's first Japanese language day school. The school was established because several Japanese parents were concerned with their children's education in the U.S., and all parties at the school emphasized re-integration into the Japanese educational system when the students return to their home countries.

Due to an increasing student population, the school moved to a new location in Queens in December 1980. On August 18, 1991, the school moved to Yonkers in Westchester County, New York. After one year in Yonkers, the school moved to Connecticut. On September 1, 1992, classes began at its current location. Grades 1 through 3 were added in 1996, allowing the school to have a continuous grades 1-9 education program. Since the move, the school had been called the "Greenwich Japanese School" in English, while  among the Japanese, it is still known as "The Japanese School of New York". In 1994, the administrators had plans to admit American students. That year, the school had 420 students. As of 1994 80% of those students were on temporary stays in the United States of five or fewer years. As of that year, the ratio of boys to girls was almost 3 to 1.

On April 1, 1992, the school opened a branch campus in New Jersey with grades 1 through to 4. On April 1, 1999, the New Jersey campus became its own institution, the New Jersey Japanese School.

By 2002, due to a decrease of Japanese families in Westchester County, the school's population decreased. The school had concerns about remaining financially solvent due to fewer tuition dollars collected.

In 2010 the school celebrated its 35th anniversary.

Campus
The current campus is located in Greenwich, Connecticut. The campus, the former Rosemary Hall school for girls, has  of space and over 15 buildings. The campus, situated along Lake Avenue, shares its facilities with the Carmel Academy (formerly the Westchester Fairfield Hebrew Academy). The campus includes the St. Bedes Chapel.

Originally it was located at 187-90 Grand Central Parkway. in Jamaica Estates, Queens, near Jamaica. On December 22, 1980, The first location was the former Parkway School Building, purchased by the Japanese school.

It moved to 196-25 Peck Avenue in Fresh Meadows, Queens, near Flushing. The second Queens location was the former P.S. 179, which the school leased from the New York City Board of Education. Rick Lyman of the Philadelphia Inquirer said in 1988 that the red brick building had been covered in graffiti. The school moved to Yonkers on August 18, 1991, and to Greenwich on September 1, 1992.

By the 2000s, several buildings in the Greenwich campus were vacant due to the decreased student population. In 2006 the Westchester Fairfield Hebrew Academy purchased the Rosemary Hall campus from the Japanese Education Alliance for $20 million, and classes for that school began there in September 2006. The Japanese school classes remained on the Rosemary Hall campus; the Hebrew school leased several buildings on the campus to the Japanese school for up to eight years. The classes of each school are held in separate buildings, while both schools share the fieldstone gymnasium.

In 2005 an arson incident occurred on the school campus. An office building was destroyed as a result of the arson. The building had a kitchen and two offices on the first floor, and a one bedroom apartment, which was not occupied at the time of the fire, on the second floor. The Japanese Educational Institute of New York occupied the building.

Curriculum
The school uses the Japanese educational system curriculum. Aspects of the Japanese curriculum offered at the school include art, English, Japanese, music, physical education, and social studies. In addition to the Japanese curriculum, students also take American social studies and extra English lessons. The total amount of English instruction per week per student, as of 1988, was five hours per week, while each student took one hour of American social studies instruction per week. The school does not have electives. As of 1987 it offers a "morals" class which teaches children how to work in groups and following the mores of Japanese society. As of 2002, with the exception of English, all classes are taught in the Japanese language.

In 1987 Torao Endo, the principal, said that in this school students are encouraged to volunteer their own answers to questions and to directly say what they think, in keeping with American culture; Endo said that such behaviors are discouraged in Japanese schools.

In 1986 the school had 16 American teachers; these teachers give English and American social studies classes. As of 1986 the school arranges one day exchanges with local American schools so that the students attending The Japanese School of New York do not become too isolated from the United States.

As of 1988 the school was certified by the New York state government, so graduates are eligible to attend American high schools.

Student body
 the students attending the school tended to be the children of bankers, businesspeople, and diplomats.
 over 30% of parents of Japanese mandatory school age children in the New York City area sent their children to the Japanese day school instead of using a combination of the local American schools and the Japanese Weekend School of New York; parents who chose to send their children to the JSNY wanted to raise them as mainstream Japanese people as opposed to being more influenced by foreign cultures. As of the 1980s, students who graduated from the school typically went back to Japan to enter high schools and universities in Japan. Since parents placed greater expectations on male children to do well on examinations, compared to girls, more boys are enrolled at the school than girls. Japanese society had the concept that boys would take jobs in large, stable companies, and that girls would become educated, but would primarily become housewives.

When the school was first established, most of the students lived in Queens, and some commuted from New Jersey and Westchester County. As of 1983 students came from New York City and from suburbs of New York City. In 1983 the school had 325 boys and 125 girls. In 1986 students came from all five New York City boroughs, Long Island, New Jersey, and Westchester County. In 2002 about 75% of its students consisted of families living in Westchester County, New York.

In 1975 the school had 152 students and covered grades four through six. In 1983 the school had 450 students. In 1986 it had 482 students. In 1987 it had about 460 students, and covered grades five through nine. As of 1988 the school enrollment was capped, with 560 students being the highest allowable number. In 1992 the school had 417 students. In 2001 it had 314 students. In 2002 it had 253 students. The enrollment declined because of a decreasing Japanese corporate presence in the New York City area due to the stagnation of the Japanese economy. In 2005 it had 240 students in grades one through nine.

Student discipline
In 1983 Suzanne Paluszek, an American national who taught English at the school, said that students at the school were better behaved than students at American schools.

As of 1987 the school does not have a dress code, in keeping with the practices of most American schools.

Tuition and funding
As of 1988 tuition and other private sector sources funded about 40% of the school's expenditures while the Japanese public sector provided the remaining 60%.

In 1983 the tuition was $300 ($ according to inflation) per month, and bus transportation was included. In 1987 the tuition ranged from $1,910 ($ when adjusted for inflation) to $2,280 ($ when adjusted for inflation) per year. In 1994 for elementary students the yearly tuition was $3,384 ($ adjusted for inflation) while for junior high students it was $3,816 ($ adjusted for inflation). In 2002 the tuition was $7,000 ($ adjusted for inflation) per year per student.

Weekend schools
 about 1,300 students of Greenwich Public Schools attend Saturday classes at the Japanese School of New York. In 1983 the school held weekend schools in several locations. Most classes are held in public school facilities, and as of 1983 classes operate for two hour periods on Saturdays. In 1983 the majority of Japanese national students within Greater New York City attended U.S. schools. To have education in the Japanese language and Japanese literature, they attend the weekend classes offered by the Japanese School of New York.

Extra-curricular activities
As of 1986 the school holds an annual fair. When it moved to a new location in Queens in 1980, it held a fair to introduce Japanese culture to Americans living in the area. The fair was so popular that the school continued holding it.

See also

 Japanese in New York City
 Japanese Weekend School of New York - Japanese weekend school in the New York City area
 New York Seikatsu Press
 American School in Japan, American international school in Tokyo

References
  Kunieda, Mari (國枝 マリ; School of International Cultural Relations). "Assimilation to American Life vs.Maintenance of Mother Culture : Japanese and Korean Children in New York" (Archive; Japanese title: 異文化接触と母国文化 : 在ニューヨーク日本人・韓国人子女の場合). Hokkaido Tokai University Bulletin (北海道東海大学紀要): Humanities and social sciences (人文社会科学系) 1, 131–147, 1988. Hokkaido Tokai University. See profile at CiNii. Abstract in Japanese available.

Notes

Further reading
 Endō, Ai (遠藤 愛 Endō Ai), of Iwaki Municipal Yoshima Junior High School (福島県いわき市立好間中学校). "ニューヨーク日本人学校における特別活動の実践." (Archive). 在外教育施設における指導実践記録集 第35集 (58件). Tokyo Gakugei University Center for Research in International Education (CRIE, 東京学芸大学 国際教育センター). p. 77-79.
 佐藤 壮康 (ニューヨーク日本人学校) and 小澤 至賢 (国立特別支援教育総合研究所教育相談部). "ニューヨーク日本人学校における「予防的な視点」で取り組む特別支援教育の実践" (Archive). 国立特別支援教育総合研究所教育相談年報 29, 23–34, 2008–06. National Institute of Special Needs Education (独立行政法人国立特別支援教育総合研究所). See profile at CiNii.
 田中 圭 (前ニューヨーク日本人学校:千葉県香取郡神崎町立神崎中学校). "在外教育施設における進路指導の実践 : ニューヨーク日本人学校中等部における3年間の進学指導の実践 (第3章 教科外指導)." 在外教育施設における指導実践記録 32, 55–58, 2009-10-1. Tokyo Gakugei University. See profile at CiNii.
 小野 博史 (前ニューヨーク日本人学校:北海道札幌市立中の島小学校). "ニューヨーク日本人学校の教育課程遂行のために(その他)." 在外教育施設における指導実践記録 33, 227–229, 2010-12-24. Tokyo Gakugei University. See profile at CiNii.
 石原 敏晴 (ニューヨーク日本人学校での特別支援教育の経験から (特集2 特別支援教育コーディネーターとして今していること)  [in Japanese]). 月刊学校教育相談 18(10), 50–57, 2004–08. ほんの森出版. See profile at CiNii.

External links
 The Japanese School of New York 
 English content
 
  
 The Japanese Educational Institute of New York 
 Greenwich Historical Society. "Greenwich Historical Society board chair Susan Larkin receives Uezumi award." Stamford Plus.
 http://faculty.lagcc.cuny.edu/tnagano/japaneseSchools/ List of Japanese schools and daycare facilities in New York City

Asian-American culture in Connecticut
Private elementary schools in Connecticut
Private middle schools in Connecticut
Schools in Greenwich, Connecticut
New York
New York
International schools in New York City
International schools in New York (state)
Greenwich, Connecticut
1975 establishments in New York City
Educational institutions established in 1975
Japanese-American culture in New York (state)
Private K–8 schools in the United States
Private K–8 schools in New York City
Private K–8 schools in New York (state)
Private middle schools in Queens, New York
Private elementary schools in Queens, New York
Education in Yonkers, New York
Schools in Westchester County, New York
Private middle schools in New Jersey
Private elementary schools in New Jersey